General Sir Cameron Deane Shute,  (15 March 1866 – 25 January 1936), was a senior British Army officer during the First World War.

Early life and education
Shute was born in Dorking, Surrey, the son of Col. Deane Christian Shute of the British Indian Army, and his wife, Elizabeth Isabella Brownlow. He was educated at Marlborough College and abroad. He was the nephew of General Sir Charles Cameron Shute (1816–1904). Francis Browne, 4th Baron Kilmaine married his sister Alice Emily Shute.

Military career
Shute was commissioned into the Welsh Regiment in 1885. He transferred to the Rifle Brigade in 1895 and participated in the Nile Expedition and the Siege of Khartoum in 1898. He was Deputy Assistant Adjutant General in Malta from 1899 and a General Staff Officer at Scottish Coast Defences from 1905. In 1910 he was appointed Commander of the 2nd Bn the Rifle Brigade and then became a General Staff Officer at Aldershot Training Centre from 1914.

He served in the First World War in France and Belgium, becoming Commander of 59th Brigade in France during the Guillemont actions in 1915. He went on to be General Officer Commanding of the Royal Naval Division in 1916, of the 32nd Division in 1917 and of the 19th Division at the Battle of Messines in France in 1917. In April 1918 he took command of V Corps in France.

After the War he became GOC of 4th Division. Finally he was General Officer Commanding-in-Chief for Northern Command in 1927; he retired in 1931.

A.P. Herbert poem 
As commander of the Royal Naval Division, Shute had an intense dislike of its unconventional "nautical" traditions and made numerous unpopular attempts to stamp them out. He was particularly critical of the poor management of the latrines which could have led to an outbreak of dysentery. Following a particularly critical inspection of the trenches by Shute, an officer of the division, Sub-Lieutenant A. P. Herbert, who later became a famous humorous writer, legal satirist and Member of Parliament, wrote a popular poem that summed up the feelings of the men of the division:

Although soldier songs hostile to superior officers were not rare, it is unusual to have a song aimed at a named officer.

References

|-

|-
 

1866 births
1936 deaths
British Army generals
British Army generals of World War I
Knights Commander of the Order of the Bath
Knights Commander of the Order of St Michael and St George
Welch Regiment officers
Rifle Brigade officers
British Army personnel of the Mahdist War
People educated at Marlborough College
Military personnel from Surrey